Benched is an American single-camera sitcom, created by Michaela Watkins and Damon Jones, about a high-powered corporate lawyer's fall from grace into the rough-and-tumble world of a public defender. The series stars Eliza Coupe and Jay Harrington in pivotal roles with Maria Bamford, Jolene Purdy, Carter MacIntyre and Oscar Nunez as the supporting cast. The show premiered on USA Network on October 28, 2014.

On January 14, 2015, USA Network cancelled Benched after one season  because of low ratings. The series premiered to 870,000 viewers in October, and while it held steady for much of its 12-episode run, its showing remained modest. Despite cancellation, Benched received mostly positive reviews during its short run with the pairing of Coupe and Harrington being pointed as the highlight of the show.

Cast
 Eliza Coupe as Nina Whitley, a career-driven corporate attorney who has a nervous breakdown and becomes a public defender for Los Angeles County
 Jay Harrington as Phil Quinlan, Nina's colleague
 Oscar Nunez as Carlos, Nina's colleague
 Jolene Purdy as Micah, an intern in the Public Defender's Office
 Carter MacIntyre as Trent Barber, Nina's former fiancé and professional nemesis

Recurring
 Maria Bamford as Cheryl, one of Nina's colleagues, described by the USA Network website  as "useless and empathetic" and the "comic relief" of the office
 Jack McGee as Burt, Nina's boss at the public defender's office
 Gary Anthony Williams as Geoffrey, the new boss who replaces Burt, who is on extended-leave after having surgery.
 Fred Melamed as Judge Don Nelson, the impatient judge who usually has it out for Nina
 Cedric Yarbough as Morris, the by-the-books bailiff in Judge Nelson's courtroom
 Peter Spruyt as Larry, one of Nina's co-workers who's been given the nickname "Boring Larry" by everyone in the office
 Catherine Reitman as Debbie, Nina's former colleague in her old lawfirm. She was also given the promotion at Nina's old lawfirm that she expected to get
 Albert Tsai as Walker, a 10-year-old boy that Trent sponsors and brings into the courtroom, where he meets Oscar and slowly get along with each other

Development and production
On May 17, 2012, the American cable television network USA ordered a pilot presentation directed by Michael Fresco, from the script by Watkins and Jones. Eliza Coupe signed on to star in the lead role of the series, produced by John Enbom, Mark Gordon and Andrea Shay. On January 24, 2014, a 12-episode first season was ordered, with Jay Harrington joining the series.

Casting announcements on the remaining series regular roles began in the following February, with Oscar Nunez cast in the series regular role of Carlos, a public defender and new colleague of Nina's. Shortly afterwards, Jolene Purdy was cast in the series regular role of Micah, an intern in the Public Defender's Office. Carter MacIntyre was the last actor to join in the series regular role of Trent, Nina's former fiancée and professional nemesis.

Episodes

Reception
Benched received positive reviews from television critics and holds a score of 63/100 on Metacritic. It also holds a 67% fresh ratings on review aggregator site Rotten Tomatoes with the site consensus stating, "Benched'''s talented ensemble raises the show above its trite writing, resulting in a nicely diverting half-hour of comedy." Alexa Planje of The A.V. Club gave the series the most praise saying, "From the writing, to the cast, to impactful details like the spot-on styling and sets, Benched exudes confidence and commitment." Melissa Maerz of Entertainment Weekly lauded the series and Eliza Coupe's performance and said, "Benched is more lightweight [than Enlightened], but it's encouragingly funny thanks to Coupe, whose attempts at anger management showcase impeccable comic timing." Maureen Ryan of The Huffington Post also gave a positive review writing, "It's rare to come across a comedy that displays such admirable focus and delivers such smartly packaged slices of diverting escapism. More, please." On the negative side Los Angeles Times'' wrote, "Benched is nowhere near as funny as it thinks it is, mainly because Watkins and Jones seem to believe that the endless humiliations of a thin, attractive, previously well-compensated blond woman are all it takes to make people laugh."

References

External links

2010s American single-camera sitcoms
2014 American television series debuts
2014 American television series endings
2010s American legal television series
English-language television shows
USA Network original programming
Television series by ABC Signature Studios